Fuller Dome is a dome-shaped, ice-covered mountain,  high, at the northwest end of the Rawson Mountains in the Queen Maud Mountains of Antarctica. It was mapped by the United States Geological Survey from surveys and U.S. Navy air photos, 1960–64, and was named by the Advisory Committee on Antarctic Names for C.E. Fuller, a storekeeper with U.S. Navy Squadron VX-6 on Operation Deep Freeze 1966 and 1967.

References

Mountains of the Ross Dependency
Amundsen Coast